"Gimme Some Head" is a single by American punk rock musician GG Allin. It was released through Orange Records on November 1, 1981 with "Dead Or Alive" as the B-side.

History
The song and its B-side both feature members of Allin's first backing band The Jabbers as well as Wayne Kramer and Dennis Thompson of proto-punk band the MC5 (credited as the MC2) on lead guitar and drums respectively. The recording sessions for both songs took place in fall 1980; these sessions also produced a third song entitled "Occupational Hazard", which was not released until the 1990s when it began circulating on bootlegs as "Occupation". The single sold around a couple thousand copies at the time of its release, making it Allin's best selling effort up until that point.

Personnel
 GG Allin - lead vocals
 Rob Basso - rhythm guitar
 Alan Chapple - bass
 Wayne Kramer - lead guitar (credited as MC2)
 Dennis "Machine Gun" Thompson - drums (credited as MC2)

Sources
 https://www.discogs.com/GG-Allin-Gimme-Some-Head-BW-Dead-Or-Alive/release/1054977
 http://www.kbdrecords.com/2006/11/05/gg-allin-gimme-some-head-7/
 https://www.allmusic.com/song/gimme-some-head-mt0003545197

References

GG Allin songs
1981 singles
1981 songs